Francisco Javier Benet Martín (born 25 March 1968 in Tétouan, Morocco) is a Spanish decathlete.

Achievements

References

External links

1968 births
Living people
Spanish decathletes
Athletes (track and field) at the 1992 Summer Olympics
Athletes (track and field) at the 1996 Summer Olympics
Athletes (track and field) at the 2000 Summer Olympics
Olympic athletes of Spain
People from Tétouan